Lake Jean Neustadt is a  artificial lake in Carter County, Oklahoma.

Other fish species found in the lake include: Channel catfish, Largemouth bass, Sunfish, and Walleye. Boating is a popular activity on the lake.

Notes

References

Reservoirs in Oklahoma
Bodies of water of Carter County, Oklahoma
Infrastructure completed in 1969